Sanjay Seth (born 25 August 1959) is an Indian politician From Bharatiya Janata Party And serves as the Member of Parliament, Lok Sabha from Ranchi, Jharkhand state, since 2019.

References

Bharatiya Janata Party politicians from Jharkhand
1959 births
Living people
India MPs 2019–present